"Enough Cryin" a song by American singer Mary J. Blige. It was written by Blige, Rodney "Darkchild" Jerkins, Sean Garrett and Shawn "Jay-Z" Carter for her seventh studio album, The Breakthrough (2005), while production was helmed by Jerkins. The song features Blige's alter ego, Brook Lynn, whom Blige created to give her lyrical freedom without the fear of damaging her own persona. "Enough Cryin" was released as the album's third single on March 2, 2006 in the United States, peaking at number 32 on the US Billboard Hot 100 and number 2 on the Hot R&B/Hip-Hop Songs chart.

Music video
The music video for "Enough Cryin" was directed by Hype Williams and shot in Long Beach, California in March 2006. Inspired by true events, Blige explained in an interview with MTV News that "the clip is [about] something that happened a long time ago, and it was a very embarrassing moment when I thought I was getting married. I was engaged to K-Ci, and I actually went on a talk show overseas and that person had just done that talk show about a week before me. I was telling the interviewer that I was getting married, and the week before he was saying that it was a rumor. He wasn't marrying me." In the video, after she leaves the interview, Blige is "kind of upset, but I'm still kind of going through my photo shoot [...] It ends up being one of the most amazing photo shoots because of all of the anger and depression and the fact that I choose to just move on with my life and be a superstar." Blige approached rapper 50 Cent to appear in the video who portrays Curtis Jackson, an R&B singer.

Track listings

Notes
 denotes a co-producer
 denotes a remix producer

Credits and personnel 
Credits adapted from the liner notes of The Breakthrough.

Mary J. Blige – executive producer, vocals, writer
Craig Brockman – piano
Patrick Fillett – engineer
Paul Foley – engineer
Rodney "Darkchild" Jerkins – mixing, producer, writer
Tony Maserati – mixing
Cornelius Mims – bass 
Tim Stuart – guitar

Charts

Weekly charts

Year-end charts

References

2005 songs
2006 singles
Mary J. Blige songs
Geffen Records singles
Music videos directed by Hype Williams
Song recordings produced by Rodney Jerkins
Songs written by Jay-Z
Songs written by Rodney Jerkins
Songs written by Sean Garrett
Songs written by Mary J. Blige
Songs written by Craig Brockman